Simone Facey (born 7 May 1985) is a Jamaican sprinter who specializes in the 100 metres.

Career
Simone attended Vere Technical High School in Clarendon, Jamaica. At the 2002 World Junior Championships in Kingston, she won a silver medal in the 100m by running 11.43. She then came back and anchored Jamaica to a gold medal in the 4x100. In her 2004 season, Simone broke Veronica Campbell's national junior record in the 200m of 22.92 by running 22.71. She then doubled at the 2004 Boys and Girls National Championships by winning the 100m and 200m. At the 2004 Penn Relays, Simone anchored her team to a record of 44.32 in the 4x100. While at Texas A&M, Simone won the 100m title at Big 12 Track and Field Championships in a meet record 10.95. Almost four weeks later, she beat teammate, Porscha Lucas, and won the NCAA 200m title. In 2009, Simone took third place in the 200 m at the 2009 Jamaican championships, guaranteeing her a place on the Jamaican team for the 2009 World Championships in Athletics. However, she only managed 11.23 seconds, and fourth place, in the 100 m thus failed to qualify for her preferred event.

Achievements

Personal bests
100 metres – 10.95 s (2008)
200 metres – 22.25 s (2008)

References

External links

1985 births
Living people
Athletes (track and field) at the 2011 Pan American Games
Jamaican female sprinters
People from Manchester Parish
World Athletics Championships medalists
Athletes (track and field) at the 2016 Summer Olympics
Olympic athletes of Jamaica
Pan American Games silver medalists for Jamaica
Pan American Games bronze medalists for Jamaica
Olympic silver medalists for Jamaica
Olympic silver medalists in athletics (track and field)
Medalists at the 2016 Summer Olympics
Pan American Games medalists in athletics (track and field)
World Athletics Championships athletes for Jamaica
World Athletics Championships winners
Medalists at the 2011 Pan American Games
Olympic female sprinters
21st-century Jamaican women